Wu Chin-fa (born 14 September 1954) is a Taiwanese writer of Hakka and indigenous descent. He was vice chairman of the Council of Cultural Affairs from 2004 to 2008, and later served as director of the Cultural Affairs Department within Pingtung County Government.

Early life and career
Wu was born on 14 September 1954, in Meinong, Kaohsiung, Taiwan. He is of Hakka and indigenous descent. Wu earned his bachelor's degree in sociology at National Chung Hsing University. He was an editorial writer for Taiwan Daily and hosted a talk show.

Wu's writing often explores ethnic conflict on Taiwan from the perspective of youths. His books include Street of Crying Swallows (1985); The Autumn Chrysanthemum (1988); Spring and Autumn Tea House (1988); and A Boyhood Trilogy (2005). The Autumn Chrysanthemum became the basis of the film Youth Without Regret.

Political career
Wu contested the Sanmin District seat on the Kaohsiung City Council during the 2002 municipal elections, representing the Taiwan Solidarity Union. He and another TSU candidate, Chen Ying-tsan, split the vote, and neither were elected. The parties involved exchanged lawsuits. In December 2003, Chiang, Lin, Shieh, and Wu founded the online television channel F4.

On 8 June 2004, Wu was sworn in as vice chairman of the Council of Cultural Affairs (CCA), succeeding Wu Mi-cha. While in office, Wu Chin-fa spoke at several domestic cultural commemoration events, among them the 2004 Joint Outdoor Puppet Performance and Contest for Promising Young Leading Performers, for the Tsou leader  and Puyuma musician , and at the Green Island Human Rights Arts Festival in 2008. As vice chair of the CCA, Wu also participated in international cultural outreach. He worked to preserve Losheng Sanatorium, and founded culture.tw, an English language web portal financed by the Council for Cultural Affairs and operated by the Central News Agency.

After leaving the Council for Cultural Affairs, Wu was sought for political commentary. He later became director of Pingtung County Government's Cultural Affairs Department. In this position, he supported the preservation of Makatao culture via financial help from the local government. As cultural director, Wu visited sites in Pingtung dating back to Taiwan's Qing and Japanese eras. In 2017, Wu worked with the Ministry of Culture to exhibit letters written by political prisoners during the White Terror at Pingtung County's cultural affairs office.

References

1954 births
Living people
20th-century Taiwanese writers
21st-century Taiwanese writers
Writers from Kaohsiung
Taiwanese politicians of Hakka descent
National Taipei University alumni
Taiwan Solidarity Union politicians
Taiwanese television presenters
Taiwanese journalists
20th-century journalists
Male journalists
Politicians of the Republic of China on Taiwan from Kaohsiung
Taiwanese male writers
Taiwanese politicians of indigenous descent
Hakka writers